Zira Khel is a village in the Khyber Pakhtunkhwa province of Pakistan. It is located at 33°14'0N 70°15'16E with an altitude of 842 metres (2765 feet) and lies close to the border with Afghanistan.

References

Populated places in North Waziristan